The Bulgarian Dynamic Shooting Federation (BDSF) is the Bulgarian association for practical shooting under the International Practical Shooting Confederation.

References

External links 
 Official homepage of the Bulgarian Dynamic Shooting Federation

Regions of the International Practical Shooting Confederation
Sports organizations of Bulgaria
Sports organizations established in 2003
2003 establishments in Bulgaria